Hellinsia siniaevi is a moth of the family Pterophoridae. It is endemic to India.

References

Moths described in 2003
siniaevi
Moths of Asia